Under the Red Robe may refer to:

 Under the Red Robe (novel), an 1894 novel about Cardinal Richelieu by Stanley J. Weyman
 Under the Red Robe (1915 film), a 1915 British silent historical film directed by Wilfred Noy, based on the novel
 Under the Red Robe (1923 film), a 1923 American silent historical drama directed by Alan Crosland, based on the novel
 Under the Red Robe (1937 film), a 1937 British / American film directed by Victor Sjöström, based on the novel